Dizjan (also Romanized as Dīzjān and Dīzejān) is a village in Kenarrudkhaneh Rural District, in the Central District of Golpayegan County, Isfahan Province, Iran. At the 2006 census, its population was 80, in 26 families.

References 

Populated places in Golpayegan County